Sarajlu (also Romanized as Sarājlū; also known as Sūrūjar, Sarājarlū, and Sarājehlū) is a village in Azghan Rural District, in the Central District of Ahar County, East Azerbaijan Province, Iran. At the 2006 census, its population was 359, in 79 families.

References 

Populated places in Ahar County